Erik Rosendahl Hansen (15 November 1939 – 30 September 2014) was a Danish sprint canoeist who competed in singles at the 1960, 1964, 1968 and 1972 Olympics. He won one gold and two bronze medals in 1960 and 1968 and placed seventh in 1964 and 1972. In 1968 he served as the Olympic flag bearer for Denmark.

Between 1958 and 1972 Hansen won 37 Danish titles and seven medals at the European Championships; he also earned five medals at the ICF Canoe Sprint World Championships: one gold (K-1 1000 m: 1963) and four silvers (K-1 500 m: 1963, 1966; K-1 1000 m: 1966, K-1 10000 m: 1970).

References

External links

1939 births
2014 deaths
Canoeists at the 1960 Summer Olympics
Canoeists at the 1964 Summer Olympics
Canoeists at the 1968 Summer Olympics
Canoeists at the 1972 Summer Olympics
Danish male canoeists
Olympic canoeists of Denmark
Olympic gold medalists for Denmark
Olympic bronze medalists for Denmark
Olympic medalists in canoeing
ICF Canoe Sprint World Championships medalists in kayak
Medalists at the 1968 Summer Olympics
Medalists at the 1960 Summer Olympics
People from Randers
Sportspeople from the Central Denmark Region